The qualifying stage of the 2013 CONCACAF U-20 Championship competition is handled by two regional bodies; the Caribbean Football Union (Caribbean zone) and the UNCAF (Central American zone).

Four teams from Central America and five from the Caribbean will qualify to the 2013 CONCACAF U-20 Championship to be played in Mexico. In addition to hosts Mexico, the United States and Canada will automatically qualify for the competition.

Caribbean zone

The qualification for the Caribbean Nations is organised by the Caribbean Football Union. In total five nations will qualify from the Caribbean zone for the 2013 CONCACAF U-20 Championship.

First round

The first round took place during 23–31 July 2012.

Group A

The group was hosted in Antigua and Barbuda and games were played the 8 to 12 August 2012. In addition to Antigua and Barbuda, the group will include Curaçao, Grenada and Dominica. Grenada were originally scheduled to host the group's games but the Grenadian FA could not afford it.

Group B

Hosted in Dominican Republic.

Group C

Hosted in Puerto Rico

Group D

Hosted in St. Vincent and the Grenadines

Best three overall second place from first round

Final Round

The final round took place during 3–11 November 2012 in Jamaica. This second qualifying round has been referred to as the Caribbean Under 20 Finals by CONCACAF.

Five of the eight teams who reached this round qualified for the 2013 CONCACAF U-20 Championship.

Group A
Hosted in Kingston, Jamaica

Group B

Best runner-up from Final round

As Curaçao and Antigua and Barbuda both had equal goal difference and points, Damien Hughes of the CFU tossed a coin to decide which team would participate in the Championship during half-time of the final Jamaica vs Cuba game in Group B. Curaçao won the toss.

Central American zone

The qualification for the Central American Nations is organised by UNCAF. The top two nations in each group will qualify for the 2013 CONCACAF U-20 Championship. Belize chose not to participate. The schedule was published on 25 June 2012.

Group A

This group is to be hosted in Honduras and games are scheduled for 17 to 21 July 2012. In addition to Honduras, the group will include Costa Rica and Nicaragua.

Group B

This group is to be hosted in Guatemala and games are scheduled for 25 to 29 July 2012. In addition to Guatemala, the group will include El Salvador and Panama.

Eighteen players were banned for a combined 94 games for their actions following the Panama's 1–0 win over Guatemala.

References 

2013 CONCACAF U-20 Championship
Qual
CONCACAF U-20 Championship qualification